Jack Barton (birth unknown – death unknown) was an English professional rugby league footballer who played between 1901 and 1910. He played at club level for Wigan as a forward (prior to the specialist positions of), during the era of contested scrums.

Playing career
Born in Standish, Barton started his career with local side Standish South End before signing for Wigan in 1901. He made his début for Wigan in December 1901 against Altrincham at Springfield Park. Barton also played in the Wigan's first match at Central Park against Batley in 1902. Barton spent nine years at Wigan, playing 213 first team games for the club and scoring 15 tries.

County Cup Final appearances
Jack Barton played as a forward, i.e. number 4 (in a 15-player team), in Wigan's 0–0 draw with Leigh in the 1905 Lancashire County Cup Final during the 1905–06 season at Wheater's Field, Broughton, on Saturday 2 December 1905, played as a forward, i.e. number 13, in the 8–0 victory over Leigh in the 1905 Lancashire County Cup Final replay during the 1905–06 season at Wheater's Field, Broughton, on Monday 11 December 1905, played as a forward, i.e. number 8, in the 10–9 victory over Oldham in the 1908 Lancashire County Cup Final during the 1908–09 season at Wheater's Field, Broughton, on Saturday 19 December 1908, and played as a forward, i.e. number 13, in the 22–5 victory over Leigh in the 1909 Lancashire County Cup Final during the 1909–10 season at Wheater's Field, Broughton, on Saturday 27 November 1909.

Honours

Club
Wigan

Championship (1): 1908–09

Lancashire County League (2): 1901–02, 1908–09

Lancashire County Cup (3): 1905, 1908, 1909

South West Lancashire League (2): 1904–05, 1905–06

References

External links
Statistics at wigan.rlfans.com

English rugby league players
People from Standish, Greater Manchester
Rugby league forwards
Rugby league players from Wigan
Wigan Warriors players
Date of birth missing
Date of death missing